The VII District is one of the central districts of Turku, Finland. It is located on the west side of the river Aura, between Aurakatu and Puistokatu. Like the neighbouring VI District, it forms part of the city's central business district. The two districts combined host a large proportion of the city's business life, particularly around the Market Square (Kauppatori, part of the VI District). Turku City Hall is located in the VII District, as well as the Turku Central Railway Station.

The district has a population of 8,749, making it the third largest district in Turku. Its annual population growth rate is 0.46%. 5.06% of the district's population are under 15 years old, while 22.53% are over 65. The district's linguistic makeup is 89.04% Finnish, 8.66% Swedish, and 2.30% other.

Notable buildings 

 Turun VFD
 Turku City Hall
 Kela building
 Building Control Department
 Southwest Finland Emergency Services
 Turku Market Hall
 Hansa Emporium shopping centre

Churches
 St. Bridget and Blessed Hemming Church
 Betel Church

Schools
 Turun klassillinen lukio
 Puolalanmäki Upper Secondary School
 Snellmanin koulu

See also
 Districts of Turku
 Districts of Turku by population

7